Ralph Kasambara is a Malawian lawyer, who served as the Minister of Justice and Attorney General since April 2012. He also served as the former Attorney General under the administration of Bingu wa Mutharika during the early part of the administration. After which he became the legal representative of the then Malawian vice-president, Joyce Banda. Kasambara has been a critic of the administration of Bingu wa Mutharika, being vocal about grounds for impeachment and commenting that  "wants to be a dictator". He was jailed in February 2012, after thugs went to his office with petrol bombs in an attempted arson plot, he called the police, together with supporters and restrained the perpetrators. Instead he was arrested for kidnapping and torture of the thugs. He was later released on bail, and then arrested again over the faulty bail procedures.

Arrests and conviction

Prior to this incident Kasambara had been a vocal critic of President Mutharika's administration. Kasambara as arrested on Monday, 14 February 2012 after a group of attempted arsonists went to his offices with petrol bombs and were subdued by him and his supporters. When they called the police, the police arrested him and five others on charges of 'kidnapping' and 'torturing' the three men. He was taken to jail, released on bail, re-arrested for a 'fraudulent bail process'. According to the police, the bail granted by High Court judge Godfrey Mwase was not valid on the grounds that the courts in Malawi are currently on wage strikes albeit all the paper work were processed under due process through court. He was then taken to a maximum security prison. He was then transferred from prison to Mwaiwathu Hospital for a cardiac condition. He was being represented by his lawyer Wapona Kita and was later released

On 8 November 2013, Kasambara was arrested on suspicion of involvement in the September shooting of whistleblower Paul Mphwiyo. following the Capital Hill Cashgate Scandal. He was subsequently denied bail, but later released on bail  He would be rearrested on money laundering charges on 27 January 2014.

On 21 July 2016, he was convicted by the High Court for conspiring to murder Paul Mphwiyo. On 30 August 2016, he was given a 13-year jail term for conspiracy to murder a civil servant, in a crime believed to be linked to a multi-million dollar corruption ring

Career
He is a law teacher at Chancellor college, University of Malawi He was an Attorney General under Bingu wa Mutharika's first administration. He later became the lawyer for Joyce Banda who was being sidelined by the administration of Bingu wa Mutharika. He is also the lawyer of Zambian President Michael Sata. 
On 26 April 2012, Malawi President Joyce Banda appointed Ralph Kasambara Minister of Justice and Attorney General. On 10 October, a few days after returning from a trip to the UN, President Joyce Banda sacked her cabinet, dropping Kasambara in the new cabinet, which was announced on 15 October 2013. Kasambara was replaced by Fahad Assani

Publications

 "Civic Education in Malawi Since 1992: An Appraisal", in Kings M. Phiri and Kenneth R. Ross, Democratisation in Malawi: A Stocktaking (book), Kacehere Publishing - 1998 
 The Legal Regime for Foreign Direct Investment in Malawi (article), UNIMA Students Law Journal - 2000,.

References

20th-century Malawian lawyers
21st-century Malawian lawyers
Malawian human rights activists
Living people
Government ministers of Malawi
Academic staff of the University of Malawi
Attorneys-General of Malawi
Year of birth missing (living people)